The 1989–90 Honduran Liga Nacional season was the 24th edition of the Honduran Liga Nacional.  The format of the tournament remained the same as the previous season.  Club Deportivo Olimpia won the title after defeating Real C.D. España in the finals.  Both teams qualified to the 1990 CONCACAF Champions' Cup.

1989–90 teams

 Curacao (Tegucigalpa)
 Marathón (San Pedro Sula)
 Motagua (Tegucigalpa)
 Olimpia (Tegucigalpa)
 Platense (Puerto Cortés)
 Real España (San Pedro Sula)
 Sula (La Lima)
 Súper Estrella (Danlí, promoted)
 Victoria (La Ceiba)
 Vida (La Ceiba)

 Platense played their home games at Estadio Francisco Morazán due to renovations at Estadio Excélsior.

Regular season

Standings Group A

Standings Group B

Final round

Relegation playoffs

Relegation standings

Pentagonal standings

Final

 Olimpia 1–1 Real España on aggregate; Olimpia champions as better goal difference in Regular season and Final round together.

Top scorer
  Álex Geovany Ávila (Real España) with 13 goals

Squads

Known results

Round 1

Pentagonal

Unknown rounds

References

Liga Nacional de Fútbol Profesional de Honduras seasons
1989–90 in Honduran football
Honduras